John Herbert Crawford,  (22 March 1908 – 10 September 1991) was an Australian tennis player during the 1930s. He was the World No. 1 amateur for 1933, during which year he won the Australian Open, the French Open, and Wimbledon, and was runner-up at the U.S. Open in five sets, thus missing the Grand Slam by one set that year. He also won the Australian Open in 1931, 1932, and 1935. He was inducted into the International Tennis Hall of Fame in 1979.

Early life
Crawford was born on 22 March 1908 in Urangeline, near Albury, New South Wales, the second youngest child of Jack Sr. and Lottie Crawford. He had no tennis training as a child and practised mainly by hitting against the house and school and playing his older brother. Crawford played his first competition match at age 12 in a mixed doubles match at the Haberfield club. He won the Australian junior championships four consecutive times from 1926 to 1929 which entitled him to the permanent possession of the trophy.

Career
Although he won a number of major championship titles he is perhaps best known for something he did not do – complete the tennis Grand Slam in 1933, five years before Don Budge accomplished the feat for the first time in 1938.

In 1933, Crawford won the Australian Championships, French Championships, and Wimbledon Championships, leaving him needing to win the U.S. Championships to complete the Grand Slam. An asthmatic who suffered in the muggy summer heat of Forest Hills, Crawford was leading the Englishman Fred Perry in the final of the US Championships by two sets to one when his strength began to fade. It was said that Crawford was an asthmatic who frequently took brandy mixed with sugar to help his breathing during matches, and on the muggy afternoon in Forest Hills he was said to have downed two or three doses of the concoction, though there are differing accounts of what Crawford actually drank. Crawford ended up losing the match by the final score of 3–6, 13–11, 6–4, 0–6, 1–6.

Crawford was ranked World No. 1 amateur in 1933 by A. Wallis Myers, Bernard Brown, Pierre Gillou,
Didier Poulain, John R. Tunis (The Literary Digest), Harry Hopman (Melbourne Herald), Alfred Chave (Brisbane Telegraph), "Set" (The West Australian) and Ellsworth Vines.

Crawford exacted some measure of revenge against Perry at the 1935 Australian, winning the final against Perry in four sets. Historically, he was competing in his tenth straight major final, a record matched only by Big Bill Tilden and then joined by Roger Federer. He advanced to his last Australian finals in 1936 and 1940, felled each time by fellow Aussie Adrian Quist, but he had set a record by making seven Australian finals appearances, equaled only by Roy Emerson in 1967.

In his 1979 autobiography Jack Kramer, the long-time tennis promoter and great player himself, included Crawford in his list of the 21 greatest players of all time.

Crawford was inducted into the International Tennis Hall of Fame in Newport, Rhode Island in 1979 and into the Australian Tennis Hall of Fame in 1997. He was made an Officer of the Order of the British Empire (OBE) in the 1977 New Year Honours for his services to sport.

Playing style

Crawford was a right-handed baseline player with a game that was based more on technical skills and accuracy than on power. He was not particularly fast but had excellent anticipation and his game was described as fluent and effortless. His style was compared with Henri Cochet. Crawford always wore long, white pressed flannels and a long-sleeved shirt. He played with an old-fashioned flat-topped racket produced by the Alexander Patent Racket Company in Launceston, Tasmania.

Grand Slam tournament finals

Singles: 12 (6 titles, 6 runners-up)

Doubles: 12 (6 titles, 6 runners-up)

Mixed doubles: 8 (5 titles, 3 runners-up)

Grand Slam singles tournament timeline

See also 
 List of male tennis players a detailed list of tennis greats throughout the years
 Tennis records of All Time – Men's singles

Sources

Notes and references

External links 

 
 
 
 
 

1908 births
1991 deaths
Australian Championships (tennis) champions
Australian Championships (tennis) junior champions
Australian male tennis players
French Championships (tennis) champions
Sportspeople from Albury
International Tennis Hall of Fame inductees
Tennis people from New South Wales
Wimbledon champions (pre-Open Era)
Grand Slam (tennis) champions in men's singles
Grand Slam (tennis) champions in mixed doubles
Grand Slam (tennis) champions in men's doubles
Grand Slam (tennis) champions in boys' singles
Grand Slam (tennis) champions in boys' doubles
World number 1 ranked male tennis players
Sport Australia Hall of Fame inductees
20th-century Australian people
Australian Officers of the Order of the British Empire
Sportsmen from New South Wales